Aldo Nannini (13 March 1951 – 4 November 1977) was a Venezuelan professional motorcycle racer. He was born in Caracas, Venezuela but grew up in Valera, Trujillo. Nannini competed in the Grand Prix road racing world championship in the 1977 Grand Prix motorcycle racing season. His best finish was a second place at the 1977 250cc British Grand Prix behind Kork Ballington. Nannini died in a road accident in Caracas after the 1977 season.

Grand Prix career statistics

(key) (Races in bold indicate pole position; races in italics indicate fastest lap)

References

External links 
 Aldo Nanini Facebook page 

Venezuelan motorcycle racers
Venezuelan people of Italian descent
Sportspeople from Caracas
People from Valera
1951 births
1977 deaths
250cc World Championship riders
Road incident deaths in Venezuela